Germán Carrera Damas (Cumaná, Sucre, 28 May 1930), is a Venezuelan historian, professor and retired ambassador, author of important works of Venezuela's historiography such as El Culto a Bolívar (1969) and Una nación llamada Venezuela (1980), among other works and essays.

References
Early review about Carrera Damas career at the National Magazine of Culture, July–August, 1961.

1930 births
Living people
People from Cumaná
Venezuelan male writers
20th-century Venezuelan historians